James E. Hamilton (born December 2, 1935) is an American former politician in the state of Oklahoma.

Biography
Hamilton was born in 1935 in Howe, Oklahoma. He attended Oklahoma State University and the University of Oklahoma and holds a Juris Doctor. He is an attorney. Hamilton is married to Nancy Jo Livesay; with her he has two children.

James Hamilton was elected to the Oklahoma State Senate as a Democrat for the 4th district in a 1967 special election to fill the seat that was held by his father, Clem Hamilton, who died on May 30, 1967. He served until 1976; during his time in the state senate he served a stint as president pro tempore from 1973 to 1975. Hamilton returned to the legislature in 1984 when he was elected to serve in the Oklahoma House of Representatives' 3rd district, which he served until 1998.

The Oklahoma Department of Corrections' Jim E. Hamilton Correctional Center is named after him.

References

1935 births
Living people
People from Le Flore County, Oklahoma
Democratic Party members of the Oklahoma House of Representatives
Democratic Party Oklahoma state senators
Oklahoma State University alumni